Orla Ní Fhinneadha is an Irish singer, teacher, television presenter and former child actor. A gaeilgeoir she has been a weather presenter and teacher on the Irish-language station TG4. She is an accomplished Sean-nós singer. She was one of the presenters of Cúla4 ar Scoil, a television series broadcasting primary school lessons to children who could not attend school due to COVID related lockdowns.

Background
Ní Fhinneadha attended Scoil Náisiúnta Cholmcille in Tully, County Galway, and Coláiste Cholmcille in Inverin. She was a contestant in the County Galway section of the Rose of Tralee competition.

Career
Ní Fhinneadha qualified as a teacher.

She presented the New Years' Eve countdown show Fáilte 2022 with Dáithí Ó Sé.

References

External links
 

Living people
Date of birth missing (living people)
Irish schoolteachers
Sean-nós singers
Television child actresses
Weather presenters
People from County Galway
21st-century Irish women singers
Year of birth missing (living people)